Les Essarts is a commune in the Loir-et-Cher department of central France.

Population

Sights
There is a small church dedicated to St. George.

See also
Communes of the Loir-et-Cher department

References

Communes of Loir-et-Cher